Notialis is a genus of moths in the family Lecithoceridae.

Species
 Notialis stigmatis Park, 2009
 Notialis vernaculae Park, 2009

References

Torodorinae
Moth genera